AS Poissy is a French football club based in Poissy (Yvelines). It was founded in 1904. They play at the Stade Léo Lagrange, which has a capacity of 3,500. The colours of the club are yellow and blue. For the 2018–19 season the club plays in the Championnat National 2. AS Poissy has played one season in Ligue 2, in 1977–78.

The AS Poissy training centre received the "Jeunes Excellence" Label in 2015, among 192 French clubs, and in 2016 the "Jeunes Élite" Label awarded by the French Football Federation. This quality label was awarded to only 76 French clubs.

Young and senior teams have been playing the highest regional and national levels for many years. Many professional players played for the club like M'Baye Niang, Gérard Soler, Fabien Raddas or Diallo Guidileye.

Honours 
 Championnat National: 1977
 Division d'Honneur: 1971 and 1982
 Coupe de la Ligue de Paris: 1948, 1953, 1971, 1988 and 2007

History 
It was founded in the year 1904 in Poissy's city during the period of the Great War. In 1968 the club fuses with the AS Simca. The club often reaches the eighth final of the Coupe de France but don't succeed in winning it.

Stadium

Léo Lagrange's Stadium 
The Léo Lagrange's Stadium is the first training center of AS Poissy Football. It is located at the exit of Poissy and contains two football fields, the Roger Quenolle Flame of Honour (3,500 places) hosting the games of the Senior's first team, and the Salif Gagigo Synthetic Field hosting the games and training of the training center (U15-U17-U19).

Cosec Stadium 
The du cosec's stadium is the second training center of the AS Poissy Football. It is located at the entrance of Poissy and contains two synthetic football fields hosting the games and training of the pre-training center (U7 to U13), a natural lawn pitch where take place the training of the senior's first team, and a dirt field hosting various sporting events.

Terrasses de Poncy's Stadium 
The Terrasses de Poncy in Poissy will host for the 2019–2020 season the male training and pre-training center of the football and handball teams of the Paris Saint-Germain Football Club. The centre will include a useful surface area of 74 hectares, 14 football fields and a 5,000 seats stadium that will accommodate, among other things, the PSG seniors reserve team.

Identity 
Pisciaceans play with a yellow jersey, blue shorts, and blue socks at home. While outside they play with a white set.
The suppliers of the club was Nike, Marcron and since 2017 Jako. AS Poissy has many supporters and is a rival of Paris Saint Germain F.C., FC Mantois 78 and Athletic Club de Boulogne-Billancourt in the same League.

Current squad

Former coaches 
 Roger Quenolle (1969–1983)
 Alain Laurier (1983–1986)
 Robert Buigues (1986–1987)
 Pascal Gressani (1988)
 Patrick Grappin (1989–1993)
 Camille Choquier (1990–1992)
 Thierry Bocquet (1992–1996)
 Patrice Ferri (1996–1999)
 Éric Dewilder (1999–2002)
 Patrice Ferri (2002–2004)
 Azzedine Meguellatti (2004–2006)
 Dominique Gomis (2006–2012)
 Thierry Bocquet (2012–2015)
 Nordine Kourichi (2015–2016)
 Kader Chehida (2016–2017)
 Laurent Hatton (2017–2019)
 Laurent Fournier (2019- )

References

External links 
  Official website

Poissy
Poissy
Association football clubs established in 1904
1904 establishments in France
Poissy
Poissy